Defending champion Martina Navratilova defeated Chris Evert in a rematch of the previous year's final, 4–6, 6–4, 6–4 to win the women's singles tennis title at the 1984 US Open. The victory marked Navratilova's sixth consecutive major singles title, tying Margaret Court and Maureen Connolly's achievement. She also became the first player in history to win the Surface Slam, having won the preceding French Open and Wimbledon. It was her second US Open singles title and eleventh major singles title overall.

This marked the first major appearance for future world No. 3 and 1990 champion Gabriela Sabatini; she was defeated in the third round by Helena Suková.

Seeds

Qualifying

Draw

Finals

Top half

Section 1

Section 2

Section 3

Section 4

Bottom half

Section 5

Section 6

Section 7

Section 8

See also
 Evert–Navratilova rivalry

External links
1984 US Open – Women's draws and results at the International Tennis Federation

Women's Singles
US Open (tennis) by year – Women's singles
1984 in women's tennis
1984 in American women's sports